Let  be some measure space with -finite measure . The Poisson random measure with intensity measure  is a family of random variables  defined on some probability space  such that

i)  is a Poisson random variable with rate .

ii) If sets  don't intersect then the corresponding random variables from i) are mutually independent.

iii)  is a measure on

Existence
If  then  satisfies the conditions i)–iii). Then  will be a Poisson random measure. In the case  is not finite the measure  can be obtained from the measures constructed above on parts of  where  is finite.

Applications
This kind of random measure is often used when describing jumps of stochastic processes, in particular in Lévy–Itō decomposition of the Lévy processes.

Generalizations
The Poisson random measure generalizes to the Poisson-type random measures, where members of the PT family are invariant under restriction to a subspace.

References
 

Statistical randomness
Poisson point processes